Henry Parker Ford (October 15, 1837 – April 21, 1905) was Mayor of Pittsburgh from 1896 to 1899.

Early life
Henry Parker Ford was born in Hudson, New York in 1837. He first worked as an accountant, experiencing much success in the trade. His skills in finance served him well in the expanding commercial center of Pittsburgh and led to his association in many industries in the city. He founded Emerson, Ford and Company, a manufacturing concern whose specialty was saw blades. In 1881 he was elected to city council.

Pittsburgh politics
For a city that sometimes goes by the nickname "city of bridges" and claims to have more bridges than any other city outside of Venice, Italy, Mayor Ford was perfect. He was the founder of the city's Department of Bridges during his term. Mayor Ford also oversaw the creation of Pittsburgh Police Department's Bicycle patrol in 1896 as well as the first water filtration in the city.

Ford died in 1905. He is buried in Homewood Cemetery on the city's east end.

References
The Political Graveyard

1837 births
1905 deaths
Mayors of Pittsburgh
People from Hudson, New York
Burials at Homewood Cemetery
 American accountants